Alpha is an unincorporated community in Fayette County, Iowa, United States. It is located on Johnsons Mill Road near County Road V68, three miles south of Waucoma, at 42.995718N, -92.047995W, where Johnsons Mill Road crosses Crane Creek.

History
 Alpha was founded in May 1871. It was named Alpha, the first letter of the Greek alphabet, because it was the first community on Crane Creek. Alpha's population was 100 in 1925.

References

Unincorporated communities in Fayette County, Iowa
Unincorporated communities in Iowa